Kyle Brown (born August 10, 1983 in Southlake, Texas) is an American soccer player, currently without a club.

Career

College and amateur
Brown attended Carroll High School, and played college soccer for the University of Tulsa from 2001 to 2005, receiving All-Conference honors in all four years he played. Throughout his career at Tulsa he appeared in 77 games, scoring 38 goals and notching 28 assists. During his college years, Brown also played for three seasons in the USL Premier Development League, for Texas Spurs, Boulder Rapids Reserve and Chicago Fire Premier.

Professional
Brown was selected in the third round, 35th overall in the 2006 MLS Superdraft by the New England Revolution, making 12 appearances for the team, before being traded to Real Salt Lake during the 2007 MLS Superdraft. He was waived by Real Salt Lake in March 2008, but was selected by MLS Cup winners Houston Dynamo in the Waiver Draft shortly thereafter. Although he made eight scoreless appearances for the senior club, he led the Dynamo reserve team with 11 goals in 12 appearances.

Brown was released by Houston on December 12, 2008, and in February 2009 Brown was signed by the Austin Aztex. He made 25 appearances and scored 1 goal for the Aztex in their debut season, but was released at the end of the year.

References

External links
 Austin Aztex bio
 MLS player profile
 Tulsa bio

1983 births
Living people
American soccer players
Austin Aztex FC players
Colorado Rapids U-23 players
Chicago Fire U-23 players
Houston Dynamo FC players
Major League Soccer players
New England Revolution players
Real Salt Lake players
Sportspeople from Tulsa, Oklahoma
Soccer players from Oklahoma
DFW Tornados players
USL First Division players
USL League Two players
Tulsa Golden Hurricane men's soccer players
New England Revolution draft picks
Association football forwards